nWave Pictures is an animation studio based in Brussels, Belgium with an office in Los Angeles, California.

History
nWave Pictures was founded on 28 October 1994 by Ben Stassen.

In September 2018, Matthieu Zeller's production group MZM acquired a majority stake in nWave Pictures.

Productions

Feature films

Upcoming films

3D films
Thrill Ride: The Science of Fun (1997)
Magic Carpet Adventure (1998)
 Encounter in the Third Dimension (1999)
 Alien Adventure (1999)
 Haunted Castle (2001)
 SOS Planet (2002)
 Misadventures in 3D (2003)
 Haunted House (2004)
 Wild Safari 3D (2005)
  Jett and Jin (2006)
 African Adventure: Safari in the Okavango (2007)
Fly Me to the Moon 4D (2008)
The Curse of Skull Rock (2009)
Turtle Vision (2010)
 Pirate Story (2011)
The Little Prince (2011)
Castle Secret (2011)
20,000 Leagues Under the Sea (2012)
Deepo: A Fish Story (2012)
The Good, The Bad and a Horse (2013)
The House of Magic 4D (2013)
Sherlock Holmes (2013)
The Lost World (2013)
Haunted Mansion (2014)
Knights Quest (2014)
Robinson Crusoe 3D (2016)
Birds of a Feather (2016)
Return to the Lost World (2017)
 The Son of Bigfoot 4D (2017)
Jolly Roger (2018)
Chaos in Wonderland (2019)
Dog Games (2019)
Rex: A Royal Topdog (2019)
Bigfoot Family 4D (2020)
Wanted Alive (2021)
Trapper's Adventures (2022)
Meg and the Lost Specter (2022)

Reception

Box office grosses

Critical and public response

References

External links
 

Animation studios
Companies based in Brussels
1994 establishments in Belgium
Mass media companies established in 1994